Elam Sibuea (10 February 1912 – 28 May 1967) was a Toba Bataknese politician and bureaucrat person who served as the Regent of North Tapanuli from 1963 until 1966.

Early life 
Sibuea was born on 10 February 1912 in a small town named Porsea, as the son of Raja Josua Sibuea. He was the oldest child out of his six brothers and sisters.

He went to study at the Meer Uitgebreid Lager Onderwijs (Junior High School) in Porsea. After graduating, he continued to study at the Hollandsch-Inlandsche School in Pematang Siantar.

Career 
Sibuea began his career in 1952, when he was employed as a city employee in Pematang Siantar. He resigned on the same year, and began to work as an employee in the office of the Governor of North Sumatra until 1956. From 1956, he moved to the Nias Island, and he worked as a wedana in Gunungsitoli, the capital of Nias until 1959. He worked as a patih (secretary) in the office of the Regent of North Tapanuli.

As the Regent of North Tapanuli 
Sibuea was inaugurated as the Regent of North Tapanuli on 1 July 1963. He resigned on 30 November 1966 due to sickness.

Death 
Sibuea died on 28 May 1967 in Pematang Siantar. He was buried in the tambak (farm) of his grandfather, Raja Musa Sibuea.

Family 
He was married to Marta née Sitorus. The marriage resulted in six sons and three daughters.

References 

1912 births
1967 deaths
Batak people
Regents of North Tapanuli
People of Batak descent
Indonesian Christians
Regents of places in Indonesia